
This is a list of the 34 players who earned their 2011 European Tour card through Q School in 2010.

 2011 European Tour rookie

2011 Results

* European Tour rookie in 2011
T = Tied 
 The player retained his European Tour card for 2012 (finished inside the top 118).
 The player did not retain his European Tour Tour card for 2012, but retained conditional status (finished between 119-150).
 The player did not retain his European Tour card for 2012 (finished outside the top 150).

Sluiter, Nørret, and Nixon regained their cards for 2012 through Q School.

Runners-up on the European Tour in 2011

See also
2010 Challenge Tour graduates
2011 European Tour

References
Final results
Player biographies and records

European Tour
European Tour Qualifying School Graduates